Betty Boop and Grampy is a 1935 Fleischer Studios animated short film starring Betty Boop. The short features Grampy in his first appearance.

Plot

Betty receives an invitation to a party from her elderly relative, Grampy. As she strolls along singing "I'm On My Way to Grampy's", she is joined by two moving men, a fireman and a traffic cop—all who irresponsibly drop everything (including a piano, a burning house and a traffic jam) to go to Grampy's party.

Grampy is an eccentric inventor, whose labor-saving devices are of the Rube Goldberg variety.  For example, he has a device that moves his entire house to the front entrance whenever the doorbell is rung. The glass shade of his ceiling light is rigged to double as a punch bowl, and he has modified an old umbrella to slice a cake into wedges.

Grampy entertains his guests by building self-playing musical instruments out of household gadgets (which then play "Hold That Tiger").  Everyone dances until they drop from exhaustion, the exception being the exuberant Grampy.

In other media

A short clip from this cartoon can be seen in the opening credits of the Futurama episode "Hell is Other Robots."

Clips from this cartoon are seen in the music video for The Outhere Brothers' "Boom Boom Boom".

A segment of music from this cartoon was sampled for the episode "Fire Dogs 2" of Ren & Stimpy "Adult Party Cartoon", when Ren dances to a flute song by Stimpy.

References

External links
 
 
 Betty Boop and Grampy on YouTube.

1935 films
Betty Boop cartoons
1930s American animated films
American black-and-white films
1935 animated films
Paramount Pictures short films
Fleischer Studios short films
Short films directed by Dave Fleischer